Liesl Karlstadt (born Elisabeth Wellano, 12 December 1892 – 27 June 1960) was a German actress and cabaret performer. Alongside Karl Valentin, she set the tone for a generation of popular culture in Munich. She appeared in more than 70 films between 1913 and 1960.

Selected filmography

 The Eccentric (1929)
 The Bartered Bride (1932)
 Must We Get Divorced? (1933)
  A Woman Like You (1933)
 Fruit in the Neighbour's Garden (1935)
 Street Music (1936)
 Thunder, Lightning and Sunshine (1936)
 Venus on Trial (1941)
 After the Rain Comes Sunshine (1949)
 Two Times Lotte (1950)
 The Lady in Black (1951)
 Desires (1952)
  That Can Happen to Anyone (1952)
 The Exchange (1952)
 As Long as You're Near Me (1953)
  Fanfares of Love (1953)
 Fireworks (1954)
 The Missing Miniature (1954) 
 Marriages Forbidden (1957)
 A Piece of Heaven (1957)
 Salzburg Stories (1957)
 Wir Wunderkinder (1958)
 My Ninety Nine Brides (1958)
 Oh! This Bavaria! (1960)
 Do Not Send Your Wife to Italy (1960)
 Fanfare of Marriage (1963)

References

Further reading
Dimpfl, Monika. Immer veränderlich: Liesl Karlstadt (1892–1960). Munich: Monacensia A-1 Verlag, 1996.
Unterstoeger, Hermann. "Das Geheimnis der Girafftorte. Immer veränderlich—eine Ausstellung über Leben und Leiden der Liesl Karlstadt," Süddeutsche Zeitung. 28 March 1996.

External links

1892 births
1960 deaths
German film actresses
20th-century German actresses
Actresses from Munich